Aldclune is a village in Perth and Kinross, Scotland. At the eastern edge of the village is the site of the Battle of Killiecrankie, which took place in 1689 during the Jacobite rising of 1689–92.

References

Villages in Perth and Kinross